The UC Santa Barbara Gauchos are the intercollegiate athletic teams who represent the University of California, Santa Barbara. Referred to in athletic competition as UC Santa Barbara or UCSB, the Gauchos participate in 19 NCAA Division I intercollegiate sports with the majority competing in the Big West Conference. UCSB currently fields varsity teams in 10 men's sports and 9 women's sports.

Over the course of the school's history, UCSB has won team national championships for 1979 men's water polo, 2006 men's soccer and 1962 men's swimming and diving (Div. II). The Gauchos, and the student-athletes who compose the teams, have won a variety of conference titles, regularly compete in NCAA championship events, and have produced professional and Olympic athletes.

The school has played a pivotal role in the collegiate athletics landscape in California. UCSB was a founding member of the California Collegiate Athletic Association, the Pacific Coast Athletic Association (now known as the Big West Conference), and the Mountain Pacific Sports Federation.

Nickname 
Those affiliated with UCSB, including alumni, faculty, and students in addition to the athletic teams, have previously gone under the nicknames Hilltoppers and Roadrunners. In September 1934, the student body voted to change the Roadrunners moniker to the Gauchos, which also applied to the athletic teams. Students felt the name more suited the campus's and Santa Barbara, California-area's Spanish architecture, Mission Santa Barbara, and the Gaucho was "essentially Spanish". The school marked the change with a small ceremony of four horse-riders prior to a football game's kickoff. Later, others attributed the change as inspired by Douglas Fairbanks' role in the eponymous film, The Gaucho.

History 
The earliest teams representing UC Santa Barbara, then known as Santa Barbara State Teachers College, appeared in the 1920s with football and basketball followed shortly by baseball.

UCSB were one of four founding members of the California Collegiate Athletic Association, which first took place during the 1938–39 school year. The association sponsored 10 sports and served as a catalyst for UCSB to elevate sports previously classified as "minor" to equal standing as "major", which provided a level playing field for all UCSB-sponsored teams.

In 1969, UC Santa Barbara was a founding member of the Big West Conference, then known as the Pacific Coast Athletic Association.

Along with a consortium of teams from the Big West Conference, Western Athletic Conference, and Pac-10 Conference, UC Santa Barbara was a founding member of the regional Mountain Pacific Sports Federation in 1992.

Sports sponsored

Baseball 

Potentially one of the oldest teams the Gauchos field, baseball can date back to at least 1923. They've appeared in 12 NCAA Division I Baseball Championships. Numerous Major League Baseball all-stars and World Series champions have come through the ranks including Shane Bieber, Skip Schumaker, Chris Speier, Michael Young, and Barry Zito.

Basketball 

Both the UCSB men and women's basketball teams play at the UCSB Events Center, commonly known as the Thunderdome.

Men's basketball 
UCSB Men's Basketball had its best years in the late '80s and early '90s under coach Jerry Pimm, highlighted by a 77–70 victory over then No. 2 and eventual National Champion UNLV in 1990, and NCAA tournament appearances in 1988 (lost to Maryland) and 1990 (defeated Houston 70-66 and lost to Michigan State 62–58). The Gauchos returned to the NCAA tournament in 2002 where they nearly upset powerhouse Arizona in the opening round. Over the years, a few of Pimm's assistants at UCSB have gone on to coach other major programs around the country, including Ben Howland (1982–1994) of UCLA and Jamie Dixon of Pittsburgh.

In the 2009–10 season, UCSB Men's Basketball was the regular season champion and final tournament champion in the Big West Conference, defeating Long Beach State. It won an automatic berth to the NCAA tournament and played 2nd seed Ohio State, losing to the Buckeyes. In 2010–2011, they placed fifth in the regular season. They defeated Long Beach State in the tournament final for the second year in a row. The Gauchos were the lowest seed to win the Big West Tournament since sixth-seeded San Jose State toppled Utah State in 1996. They played the 2nd seeded Florida Gators and lost. It was the first time that UCSB entered an NCAA Tournament in back-to-back seasons.

Some famous Gauchos basketball players are Brian Shaw, Conner Henry, Alex Harris, Lucius Davis, Don Ford, James Nunnally, and Orlando Johnson. On the women's side, Kristen Mann currently plays in the WNBA and Mekia Valentine was drafted by the New York Liberty in the 2011 WNBA Draft.

Women's basketball 
In 2005, UCSB Women's Basketball won its unprecedented ninth straight Big West Conference Championship. The team had its best year in history during the 2004 season when it advanced to the NCAA Sweet 16 where it lost to eventual champion UConn. UCSB was the only team to hold UConn to less than a double-digit victory in the NCAA playoffs. From 2000 to 2005, Tasha McDowell served as an assistant coach.

In the 2012 Big West Tournament, the UCSB women's basketball team became the first 6th seed to win the tournament. In the first round, the team traveled to UC Irvine and defeated the 3rd seeded Anteaters 61–51. The Gauchos continued on their playoff march against the Pacific Tigers in the semifinals hosted at the Honda Center in Anaheim, CA. Pacific swept UCSB in the regular season, but the Gauchos were victorious when it mattered the most as they bounced the Tigers out of the tournament with an overwhelming 84-66 decision. The 84-point output currently stands as the most points the Gauchos have scored under head coach Carlene Mitchell. After defeating the number 3 seed and number 5 seed, the Gauchos ended up being the higher ranked team in the championship game as they were set to face Long Beach State who pulled off two miraculous upsets of their own as the 7 seed. The Gauchos went on to capture its record 14th Big West crown with a 63–54 final tally. Gaucho center Kirsten Tilleman had a double-double (16 points and 11 rebounds) against the 49ers, which earned her the tournament MVP honors. She was also included on the All-Tournament team roster along with her teammate sophomore guard Melissa Zornig, who averaged 16.7 points per game in the tournament. The 2011-2012 Gauchos' season ended in the first round of the NCAA tournament where they fell 81–40 against the eventual national champion Baylor.

Cross country 
The UC Santa Barbara Gauchos men's cross country team appeared in the NCAA tournament two times, with their highest finish being 17th place in the 2001–02 school year. The UC Santa Barbara Gauchos women's cross country team appeared in the NCAA tournament four times, with their highest finish being 9th place in the 2006–07 school year.

Soccer

Men's soccer 

In 2004, the UCSB men's soccer team advanced to the College Cup. It routed Duke in the semifinals 5–0, but lost in the championship match to Indiana on penalties

In 2006, UCSB again advanced to the College Cup. In the semi-finals, UCSB and 2nd seed Wake Forest played to a 0–0 tie before UCSB won the game on penalty kicks 4–3. In the championship game, UCSB defeated UCLA 2-1 to win its first NCAA Men's Soccer title and its second NCAA championship (1979 Men's Water Polo) in school history.

In conference play, the Gauchos have dominated Big West competition. They have won the Big West Championship in 5 of the last 7 years. Also, the Gauchos have had no less than 5 former players receive full international caps.

The Gauchos have led the NCAA in attendance each year from 2007 to 2012, and averaged 5,873 fans during their 2010 home matches. The Gauchos Sep. 24, 2010 match against UCLA drew 15,896 fans, the highest attendance for an NCAA soccer match since the year 2000.

The UC Santa Barbara Gauchos men's soccer team have an NCAA Division I Tournament record of 22–12 through thirteen appearances.

Women's soccer 
The UC Santa Barbara Gauchos women's soccer team have an NCAA Division I Tournament record of 5–9 through nine appearances.

Softball 

The UC Santa Barbara Gauchos women's softball team has an NCAA Division I Tournament record of 0–6 through three appearances.

Swimming 
Based out of Campus Pool on the UCSB campus, the swimming program has seen its fair share of success. For 40 seasons Gregg Wilson was the head coach of the men's and women's swimming teams. Wilson posted a dual meet record of 292-208-1 (172-115 with the men, 120-92-1 with the women). Even more impressive, his squads have collected 36 Big West Conference Championships, 23 by his men's teams and 13 by his women's teams. Before the Texas Longhorns men's swim team broke it, the UCSB men's swim team set the NCAA record for most consecutive conference titles in any sport with 23 straight Big West Conference championships from 1979 to 2001. The men's teams have been ranked as high as 16th nationally and several of his swimmers over the years have advanced to the NCAA Championships. In fact, the men's team has turned in 38 All-American performances under Wilson.

The team is now led by Coach Matt Macedo, who took over the position in August 2016 (was an assistant coach for two years prior). The men's teamearned back to back championship titles at the Mountain Pacific Sports Federation championship (MPSF) for in 2017 and 2018, while Macedo also earned the coach of the year award in his first year.

Notable alumni of the program include Olympic gold medalists Richard Schroeder, Jason Lezak, Sandy Neilson, Sophie Kamoun, former 50-meter freestyle world record holder Bruce Stahl (the first person to ever hold this world record), and Pat Cary.

Volleyball

Men's volleyball 
The men's volleyball team has finished as the NCAA runner up 5 times, most recently in 2011. The women's volleyball team plays at the UCSB Events Center, while the men's team plays at Robertson Gymnasium.

Women's volleyball 
The UC Santa Barbara Gauchos women's volleyball team have an NCAA Division I Tournament record of 21–28 through twenty-eight appearances.

Men's water polo 
UC Santa Barbara won the 1979 National Championship in men's water polo, defeating the UCLA Bruins by a score of 11–3. This was UCSB's first ever NCAA Division I championship. The program has produced a number of notable players including Craig Wilson, Greg Boyer, John Anderson, Brian Alexander, and Ross Sinclair, who have won multiple Olympic medals between the group. The current head coach is three-time Olympian and former United States men's national water polo team captain Wolf Wigo, who also oversees the UCSB women's water polo program.

The UC Santa Barbara Gauchos men's water polo team have an NCAA Division I Tournament record of 7–11 through twelve appearances.

Former varsity sports

Football 
UCSB began playing intercollegiate football in 1921, playing as the "Roadrunners" on a field at Pershing Park. Theodore "Spud" Harder became coach in 1934; in the same year the school adopted a new name, selecting "Gauchos" in a student vote. The 1936 team finished with a 9–1 record, the best in school history, and two of its members later played for the NFL New York Giants. La Playa Stadium, now used by Santa Barbara City College, opened in 1938 and was the team's home until 1966, when Harder Stadium was built. "Cactus Jack" Curtice, who had been head coach at a number of major college programs, coached the team from 1963 to 1969: his 1965 team finished 8-1 and went to the Camellia Bowl. Under Curtice's successor, Andy Everest, the college decided to launch an NCAA Division I program, but after two seasons of dismal on-field performance and a lack of student support, the college changed directions and decided to drop the sport entirely. The Gauchos appeared in four bowl games during these 50 years, winning only once, in the 1948 Potato Bowl.

In 1930 They finished the season with a record of six wins, one loss and one tie (6–1–1). Overall, the team outscored its opponents 97–51 for the season. 

In 1936 they finished the season with a record of nine wins and one loss (9–1, 4–1 SCIAC), with the only blemish a one-point loss to League Champion San Diego State. Overall, the team outscored its opponents 223–43 for the season. The Gauchos had five shutouts, and held the other team to a touchdown or less in 8 of 10 games. 

In 1948 They finished the season with a record of six wins and five losses (6–5, 2–3 CCAA). At the end of the season, the Gauchos played in the first Potato Bowl, in Bakersfield, California. The Gauchos were Potato Bowl Champions vs Willamette University 46-7.

IN 1950 They finished the season with a record of seven wins and three losses (7–3, 3–1 CCAA).

In 1952 they finished the season with a record of eight wins and two losses (8–2, 3–1 CCAA). 

In 1956 They finished the season with a record of five wins and five losses (5–5, 1–1 CCAA). The Gauchos accepted an invitation to play in a charity bowl game. The game was the first and only Citricado Bowl, played at Escondido High School in Escondido, California against a military team from Marine Corps Recruit Depot San Diego. Which they lost 16-25 to the San Diego Marines.

In 1957 they finished the season with a record of six wins and two losses (6–2, 1–1 CCAA). 

In 1964 they finished the season with a record of four wins and seven losses (4–7). For the 1964 season they were outscored by their opponents 152–164. They played in an unsanctioned Aztec Bowl in Mexico City against a Mexican All-Star Team and lost 7-20.

In 1965 they finished the regular season with a record of eight wins and one loss (8–1). At the end of the season, the Gauchos qualified for a postseason bowl game, the 1965 Camellia Bowl, played in Sacramento, California. The lost the game against Cal State Los Angeles 10–18. That brought their final record to eight wins and two losses (8–2). For the 1965 season they outscored their opponents 225–95. Jack Curtice won the AFCA Coach of the Year for the 1965 NCAA football season NCAA Division II.

In 1987 the Gauchos competed as a Division III Independent and compiled a record of 8–2 and outscored their opponents 237 to 107 for the season. 

In 1989 Led by Mike Warren in his fourth and final season as head coach, the Gauchos compiled a record of 8–2 and outscored their opponents 313 to 150 for the season. The team played as a Division III Independent. Warren was finished his four-year stint as head coach with a record of 26–13 for a winning percentage of .667.

A student-run club team started play in 1983, and in 1985 a student referendum approved funding for a Division III, non-scholarship team. The team began play in 1987 and enjoyed some success on the field, with a 33–15 record from 1987 to 1991. However, in 1992 the NCAA decided to forbid schools playing in Division I in other sports from maintaining a lower-level football program, and UCSB dropped the sport again.

National Awards
Jack Curtice won the AFCA Coach of the Year for the 1965 NCAA football season NCAA Division II.
Jack Curtice also won the Amos Alonzo Stagg Award for the 1972 NCAA football season.

Bowl Games
1948 Potato Bowl -Bakerfield, CA vs. Willamette University 46-7 Win
1956 Citricado Bowl -San Diego, CA vs. San Diego Marines 16-7 Loss
1964 Aztec Bowl -Mexico City, CD, MX vs. Mexican All-Stars 7-20 Loss
1965 Camelia Bowl -Sacramento, CA vs. Cal State LA (College Division N0. 4 ranked) 10-18 Loss

Rivalries

Cal Poly
"Blue-Green Rivalry"

Cal Poly Mustangs won the football rivalry 21-14 games, at a total of 35 games that were played between 1923 and 1971.

San Diego State
In this 'Southern California Coastal Beach Town Rivalry' the Gouchos lost to 2 ranked Aztec teams in 1964 (SDSU NO.4) and 1970 (SDSU No.14). San Diego State Aztecs won the football rivalry 26-8-1 games, at a total of 35 games that were played between 1923 and 1971.

UC Davis
In this 'Little UC- School Rivalry' The 2 UC schools rivalry mirrors their older, larger 'UC brothers' (UC-Berkley-UCLA Rivalry) in this Southern vs. Northern California UC School Rivalry. The Gauchos won the football rivalry 14-6-2 games, at a total of 22 games that were played between 1938 and 1965.

Whittier College
This Local So. Cal Rivalry with the campuses approximately 120 miles apart form each other ran for 57 years on the gridiron. It is the longest running Rivalry years wise in UCSB football history. Whittier College Poets won the football rivalry 17-15-1 games, at a total of 33 games that were played between 1930 and 1987.

Occidental College
Only 95 miles separate the 2 college campuses. In this Local So. Cal Rivalry the Occidental Tigers won the football rivalry 16-11-2 games, at a total of 29 games that were played between 1927 and 1961.

Non-varsity club sports 
Numerous UC Santa Barbara athletic teams compete intercollegiately at the student club level without official sanction or sponsorship from the university's Athletic Department. While there are 450 students-athletes in ICA, there are over 700 in club (recreational) sports teams. Many of these teams are highly regarded and compete against intercollegiate teams from across the United States. The Women's Water Polo team captured two Collegiate Club titles, in 1987 and 1989. The Rowing Team is the current National Champion for the second consecutive year (American Collegiate Rowing Association) and Women's Team point Champion (2015).

The following teams compete in intercollegiate non-varsity club sports:

Lacrosse
UC Santa Barbara men's lacrosse competes in the Western Collegiate Lacrosse League. They won the Men's Collegiate Lacrosse Association national championship twice (2004 and 2005) and ranks in the top 5 programs in history for both national championships won and national championship finals appearances.

Rowing
Rowing was started in 1965 as the first club sport at UC Santa Barbara, predating some of the university's intercollegiate athletic teams. It was followed in 1972 by a women's side. The Gauchos compete in the American Collegiate Rowing Association, where they've won numerous national championships. The program has produced Olympic Games and national team members such as Amy Fuller.

Rugby
UC Santa Barbara previously played host to the Santa Barbara International Rugby Tournament, once the largest rugby tournament in the world which drew teams locally and internationally. UCSB has produced several top rugby players, including international team members Bill Leversee, Stuart Krohn, and Kristine Sommer. Others went on to success in other sports, such as Doug Oldershaw.

Surf
UC Santa Barbara and its campus is widely considered to be one of the top 5 "surf schools". The Gauchos compete in the National Scholastic Surfing Association. Since the organization's creation in 1978, UCSB is the most successful collegiate program in history and has won 13 collegiate national championship trophies, the last coming in 2010.

Ultimate frisbee
The Black Tide (men's team) and the Burning Skirts (women's team) are consistently top teams in the nation. The Black Tide is the most successful men's collegiate ultimate frisbee team in history and has won six national championships (1988, 1989, 1990, 1996, 1997, 1998) through USA Ultimate's college championships. It's also the only men's team to win back-to-back-to-back championships, which it accomplished twice. The Burning Skirts have won five national championships (1988, 1990, 1991, 2009, 2011), one of only three teams to have ever won back-to-back championships.

Championships

Appearances 

The UC Santa Barbara Gauchos competed in the NCAA tournament across 20 active sports (10 men's and 10 women's) 184 times at the Division I level.

 Baseball (11): 1972, 1983, 1986, 1987, 1990, 1996, 2001, 2013, 2015, 2016, 2019
 Men's basketball (5): 1988, 1990, 2002, 2010, 2011
 Women's basketball (14): 1992, 1993, 1997, 1998, 1999, 2000, 2001, 2002, 2003, 2004, 2005, 2008, 2009, 2012
 Men's cross country (2): 2001, 2006
 Women's cross country (4): 2003, 2004, 2006, 2007
 Men's golf (2): 1994, 1998
 Men's soccer (13): 2002, 2003, 2004, 2005, 2006, 2007, 2008, 2009, 2010, 2011, 2013, 2015, 2019
 Women's soccer (9): 1984, 1985, 1986, 1987, 1989, 1990, 1991, 2008, 2009
 Softball (3): 2004, 2006, 2007
 Men's swimming and diving (22): 1965, 1966, 1967, 1968, 1972, 1980, 1981, 1982, 1983, 1984, 1985, 1987, 1990, 1991, 1992, 1994, 1995, 1997, 1998, 1999, 2006, 2007
 Women's swimming and diving (9): 1982, 1986, 1987, 1988, 1989, 1990, 2008, 2009, 2014
 Men's tennis (14): 1996, 1997, 1998, 2002, 2003, 2006, 2007, 2008, 2009, 2013, 2015, 2016, 2017, 2018, 2019
 Women's tennis (4): 1994, 1996, 2016, 2017
 Women's indoor track and field (2): 2012, 2019
 Men's outdoor track and field (13): 1948, 1949, 1950, 1956, 1960, 1973, 1983, 1984, 1991, 2007, 2010, 2011, 2012
 Women's outdoor track and field (7): 1984, 2003, 2006, 2007, 2010, 2012, 2019
 Men's volleyball (7): 1970, 1971, 1972, 1974, 1975, 1988, 2011
 Women's volleyball (29): 1981, 1982, 1983, 1984, 1985, 1986, 1987, 1988, 1989, 1990, 1991, 1992, 1993, 1994, 1995, 1996, 1997, 1998, 1999, 2000, 2001, 2002, 2003, 2004, 2005, 2006, 2009, 2013, 2019
 Men's water polo (12): 1969, 1970, 1972, 1973, 1974, 1976, 1979, 1980, 1981, 1982, 1985, 1990
 Women's water polo (1): 2016

Team 

The Gauchos of UC Santa Barbara earned 2 NCAA championships at the Division I level.

Men's (2)
 Soccer (1): 2006
 Water polo (1): 1979

Results

UC Santa Barbara won 1 national championship at the NCAA Division II level.

 Men's swimming and diving: 1967

Below are twenty-six national club team championships:

 Co-ed cycling (1): 1988 (USA Cycling)
 Co-ed sailing (1): 1984 (ICSA)
 Co-ed surfing (13): 1984, 1985, 1986, 1988, 1991, 1992, 1994, 1996, 1998, 2002, 2005, 2008, 2010 (NSSA)
 Men's ultimate (6): 1988, 1989, 1990, 1996, 1997, 1998 (USA Ultimate)
 Women's ultimate (5): 1988, 1990, 1991, 2009, 2011 (USA Ultimate)

Individual 

UC Santa Barbara had 1 Gaucho win an NCAA individual championship at the Division I level.

At the NCAA Division II level, UC Santa Barbara garnered 12 individual championships.

National Award Winners

Traditions

Mascot 
The official mascot of the UC Santa Barbara is Olé. In September 1934, the student body voted to change the Roadrunners moniker to the Gauchos, which also applied to the athletic teams. The mascot, Olé, is the costumed mascot representing the "Gauchos" nickname.

School colors 
The school colors are "Pacific Blue" (Pantone 286) and "Gaucho Gold" (Pantone 130), with the occasional accent of "Navy Blue" (Pantone 275). In 2009, the program underwent a transformation, giving UCSB a new brand and visual identity. As a result, the UCSB athletic program released new logos, different colors, and a unified theme across all teams.

Rivalries

The Blue-Green rivalry 

The main rival of UC Santa Barbara is the Cal Poly Mustangs who compete together in the Blue–Green Rivalry. The Blue-Green Rivalry, which started in November 1921 with a football game, was formalized in 2009. This new format calculates earned points between UCSB and Cal Poly to determine a winner based on their teams' competitive results against each other. Additionally, collegesoccernews.com ranked UC Santa Barbara vs. Cal Poly as the Greatest Rivalry in College Soccer.

The Beach Schools Rivalry

UC Santa Barbara also has a long-standing "Beach School" rivalry with Long Beach State .

UCSB Intercollegiate Athletics Hall of Fame 
The UCSB Gauchos Intercollegiate Athletics Hall of Fame was announced on December 8, 1959. During the construction of Robertson Gymnasium, plans were in place to establish a Hall of Fame located in the new gymnasium. Following the completion of Rob Gym, the inaugural class was announced as C. James Anderson, Sam Cathcart, Tom Guerrero, Doug Oldershaw, Ernie Saenz, and Howard Yeager.

Notes

References

External links